The 1961 European Cup Winners' Cup Final was an association football match contested between Fiorentina of Italy and Rangers of Scotland. It was the final match of the 1960–61 European Cup Winners' Cup and the first European Cup Winners' Cup final. It was the only time that the final was played over two legs. The first leg was played at Ibrox Park, Glasgow and the second leg at the Stadio Comunale in Florence. It was Rangers first European final and in doing so became the first Scottish team to reach the final of a European football competition. It was Fiorentina's second European final having previously reached the 1957 European Cup Final.

Fiorentina won the final 4–1 on aggregate.

Route to the final

Rangers

Rangers were required to play a preliminary round in the competition where they beat Ferencváros from Hungary 5-4 on aggregate.  They were then drawn against Borussia Mönchengladbach from Germany who they then defeated 11-0 on aggregate.  In the semi final Rangers were then required to play English team Wolverhampton Wanderers.  Rangers won the tie 3-1 on aggregate to reach their first ever European final.

Fiorentina

Fiorentina went straight into the quarter-finals where they played FC Luzern from Switzerland. They subsequently defeated them and Dinamo Zagreb to reach the final.

Background
The 1961 final was the only time that it had been played over two legs until the competition was merged with the UEFA Cup in 1999.

Fiorentina, who were managed by Hungarian Nándor Hidegkuti, were the recent Coppa Italia winners and had reached the final of the European Cup four years earlier.  Their team included many Italian internationals including goalkeeper Enrico Albertosi and Swedish star player Kurt Hamrin.

Rangers were managed by Scot Symon and had reached the semi-final of the European Cup the previous year. Since the start of the 1960-61 season , the all-Scottish Rangers team also included Jim Baxter who would go on to become a legendary figure of the club. Rangers top scorer Jimmy Millar missed the first leg through injury but featured in the return match.

Match details

First leg

Second leg

See also
ACF Fiorentina in European football
Rangers F.C. in European football

References

External links
UEFA Cup Winners' Cup results at Rec.Sport.Soccer Statistics Foundation
1961 European Cup Winners' Cup Final at UEFA.com

3
Cup Winners' Cup Final 1961
Cup Winners' Cup Final 1961
1961
Cup Winners' Cup Final 1961
Cup Winners' Cup Final 1961
Cup Winners' Cup Final
Cup Winners' Cup Final
1960s in Glasgow
European Cup Winners' Cup Final
International sports competitions in Glasgow
European Cup Winners' Cup Final
Football in Glasgow